Vincenzo Pucitta (or Puccitta; 17 February 1778 – 20 December 1861) was a nineteenth-century Italian composer.  Born in Civitavecchia, he wrote more than 20 operas during his career.  One of his works, La Vestale, after its premiere in London (1810), was also sung in Lisbon (1816), Milan (1816) and Rio de Janeiro (1817).  He died in Milan.

Operas

Le nozze senza sposa (1800, Parma)
Bianca de' Rossi (1800, Florence)
L'amor platonico (1800, Lucca)
Il fuoruscito (1801, Milan)
Teresa e Wilk (1802, Venice)
Werter e Carlotta (1802, Venice)
Il puntiglio (Furberia e puntiglio) (1802, Milan)
La perfidia scoperta (1803, Venice)
Zelinda e Lindoro (1803, Venice)
Lauretta (1803, Padua)
La burla fortunata ossia I due prigionieri (1804, Venice); 
Lo sposo di Lucca (1805, Venice)
Andromaca (1806)
Il marchese d'un giorno ovvero Gli sposi felici (1808, Livorno)
La caccia di Enrico IV (1809, London)
La vestale (1810, London)
Il trionfo di Rosselane ossia Le tre sultane (1811, London)
Adolfo e Chiara (1812, Turin)
Ginevra di Scozia (1812)
Boadicca (1813)
Il feudatario (1813, Trieste)
Aristodemo (1814, London)
Gli due prigionieri ossia Adolfo e Clara (1814, London)
L'orgoglio avvilito (1815, Paris)
La principessa in campagna o Il marchese nell'imbarazzo (La principessa bizarra) (1817, Paris)
Il maestro di cappella (1818, Trieste)
La festa del villaggio (1822, Rome)
La Fausse Agnès (1824, Paris)

Notes

Italian opera composers
Male opera composers
Italian classical composers
Italian male classical composers
1778 births
1861 deaths
People from Civitavecchia